This article is about the 2007 season of the Wigan Warriors in the Super League and Challenge Cup.

Season preview
2006 was a poor season for Wigan finishing 8th overall in the Super League but for most of the season they were battling with relegation. In 2007 Wigan will look to avoid another season like 2006, many players from the 2006 squad have left Wigan and been replaced by players such as Trent Barrett, Phil Bailey and Thomas Leuluai who will be important members of the 2007 Wigan squad. Players like Stuart Fielden and Chris Ashton who has impressive season in 2006 will be looking to continue their form in 2007 and some young academy player such as Darrell Goulding, Paul Prescott and Michael McIlorum will be looking to break into the first team in 2007. Wigan start the season with a tough home fixture against Warrington Wolves. Wigan will play local rivals St. Helens 4 times during the regular season including a match in Cardiff's Millennium Stadium.

Fixtures and results

↑ Wigan Warriors only played a second grade squad against Whitehaven, mostly made up of players from the Wigan Warriors Academy.

League table
Final League Table

1Bradford deducted 2 points for breaching of salary cap rules.

2Wigan deducted 4 points for breaching salary cap rules.

Wigan Warriors round by round progress during the 2007 Super League season

2007 Full squad

1 Denotes a player who left Wigan Warriors during 2007. For more information see Transfers Section

Transfers
Transfer for 2007 (In)

Transfer for 2007 (Out)

2007 Loans (Out)

Club personnel 2008 

President – Peter Higginbottom
Life Members – Joe Egan, Billy Blan, Johnny Lawrenson

DIRECTORS

Owner and chairman – Ian Lenagan (as from 1 December 2007)
company secretary – Paul Wright

RUGBY

Head Coach – Brian Noble
Assistant Coach – Phil Veivers

References

External links
 Official site
 Wigan RL 2007 Season on the Wigan RL Fansite.
 Wigan RL 2007 Senior Academy Team on the Wigan RL Fansite.
 Wigan RL 2007 Junior Academy Team on the Wigan RL Fansite.
 Wigan-Warriors fan site

Wigan Warriors seasons
Wigan Warriors season